Medini Rai Medical College and Hospital, Palamu (earlier name Palamu Medical College) is a full-fledged tertiary referral Government Medical college. It was established in the year 2019. The college offers the degree Bachelor of Medicine and Surgery (MBBS).

Location 
Medini Rai Medical College and Hospital is located in Medininagar, Palamu.

About College
The college is affiliated with the Nilamber-Pitamber University and is recognized by the National Medical Commission. The hospital associated with the college is one of the largest hospitals in the Palamu district. The selection to the college is done on the basis of merit through National Eligibility and Entrance Test. Yearly undergraduate student intake is 100 from the year 2019.

Courses
Palamu Medical College undertakes education and training of students MBBS courses.

See also

References

External links 
 http://mmchpalamu.org/

Medical colleges in Jharkhand
Colleges affiliated to Nilamber-Pitamber University
Educational institutions established in 2019
2019 establishments in Jharkhand
Universities and colleges in Jharkhand